Chôros No. 4 is a quartet for three horns and trombone, written in 1926 by the Brazilian composer Heitor Villa-Lobos. It forms a part of a series of fourteen numbered compositions collectively titled Chôros, ranging from solos for guitar and for piano up to works scored for soloist or chorus with orchestra or multiple orchestras, and in duration up to over an hour. Chôros No. 4 is one of the shorter members of the series, a performance lasting about five-and-a-half minutes.

History

Chôros No. 4 was composed in Rio de Janeiro in 1926, and was premiered on 24 October 1927 at the Salle Gaveau in Paris, in the first of a pair of concerts devoted to works by Villa-Lobos. The performers were Edmond Entraigue, Jean-Lazare Pénable, and Mr. Marquette, horns; Jules Dervaux, trombone. On the same programme, Arthur Rubinstein gave the premiere of Rudepoêma. The first North American performance took place on 16 October 1940 at the Museum of Modern Art in New York City. The score is dedicated to Villa-Lobos's patron , the brother of the dedicatee of Chôros No. 5.

Analysis
When an American University professor wrote to Villa-Lobos requesting an analysis of Chôros No. 4, the composer responded: "My works are meant to be played, not analysed".

The work is in three parts, subdivided into nine sections. The first part comprises subsections 1–6, the second part is an undivided, slow "cradle song" (subsection seven), and the last part consists of subsections 8 and 9. The third, concluding part is contrasted to everything that precedes it, and is closer to jazz or Cuban music than to anything Brazilian.

According to another opinion, the work actually falls into two sections, forming an AB form structurally analogous to Chôros No. 10, in which the second part is distinguished by the character of popular music.

References
 
 

Footnotes

Further reading
 
 Albuquerque, Joel Miranda Bravo de. 2012b. "Villa-Lobos e a Música Popular Urbana Carioca: Argumento Nacionalista no Choros No. 4". Anais do II Simpósio Brasileiro de Pós-Graduandos em Música: Subárea de Linguagem e Estruturação / Teoria da Música, 1013–23.
 
 
 
 
 Mathie, David. 1991. "An Important Alternative in Horn Chamber Music: Heitor Villa-Lobos' Choros No. 4". The Horn Call 21, no. 2 (April): 35.

External links
 villalobos.iu.edu Villa-Lobos site at Indiana University: Maintained by the Latin American Music Center

Compositions by Heitor Villa-Lobos
1926 compositions
Chamber music compositions
Compositions for horn
Compositions for trombone
Music dedicated to benefactors or patrons